There are two classes of survey ships of the British Royal Navy known as the Echo-class:

 Echo-class survey ship (1957)
 Echo-class survey ship (2002)